Cyrtolites is an extinct genus of monoplacophorans in the family Cyrtolitidae.

 Names brought to synonymy
  Cyrtolites elegans S.A. Miller 1874, a synonym for Phragmolites elegans

Subtaxa 
 Subgenera
 Cyrtolites (Cyrtolites)
 Cyrtolites (Cyrtonella)

 Species
Cyrtolites budleighensis, Cyrtolites claysferryensis, Cyrtolites craigensis, Cyrtolites dilatus, Cyrtolites disjunctus, Cyrtolites grandis, Cyrtolites hornyi, Cyrtolites inornatum, Cyrtolites inprobus, Cyrtolites insculptus, Cyrtolites nodosus, Cyrtolites occultus, Cyrtolites ornatus (type), Cyrtolites retrorsus, Cyrtolites rugosus, Cyrtolites seminulum, Cyrtolites sinuosus, Cyrtolites thraivensis, Cyrtolites trentonensis, Cyrtolites tuboides, Cyrtolites undulatus

References

External links 
 

Prehistoric monoplacophorans
Prehistoric mollusc genera
Paleozoic life of Ontario
Paleozoic life of Quebec